Lemyra quadrisaccus is a moth of the family Erebidae. It was described by Jeremy Daniel Holloway in 1982. It is found in Malaysia (Malacca), Thailand and Vietnam.

References

 

quadrisaccus
Moths described in 1982